This article is about the particular significance of the year 1820 to Wales and its people.

Incumbents
Lord Lieutenant of Anglesey – Henry Paget, 1st Marquess of Anglesey 
Lord Lieutenant of Brecknockshire and Monmouthshire – Henry Somerset, 6th Duke of Beaufort
Lord Lieutenant of Caernarvonshire – Thomas Bulkeley, 7th Viscount Bulkeley
Lord Lieutenant of Cardiganshire – William Edward Powell
Lord Lieutenant of Carmarthenshire – George Rice, 3rd Baron Dynevor 
Lord Lieutenant of Denbighshire – Sir Watkin Williams-Wynn, 5th Baronet    
Lord Lieutenant of Flintshire – Robert Grosvenor, 1st Marquess of Westminster 
Lord Lieutenant of Glamorgan – John Crichton-Stuart, 2nd Marquess of Bute 
Lord Lieutenant of Merionethshire – Sir Watkin Williams-Wynn, 5th Baronet
Lord Lieutenant of Montgomeryshire – Edward Clive, 1st Earl of Powis
Lord Lieutenant of Pembrokeshire – Richard Philipps, 1st Baron Milford
Lord Lieutenant of Radnorshire – George Rodney, 3rd Baron Rodney

Bishop of Bangor – Henry Majendie 
Bishop of Llandaff – Herbert Marsh (until 28 April); William Van Mildert (from 31 May)
Bishop of St Asaph – John Luxmoore 
Bishop of St Davids – Thomas Burgess

Events
29 January – The Prince of Wales becomes King George IV of the United Kingdom upon the death of his father, King George III, and the title falls into abeyance for 21 years. 
14 April – At the completion of the United Kingdom general election:
Henry Paget, later Marquess of Anglesey, is elected as member for Anglesey. 
Wyndham Lewis is elected for Cardiff.
Christopher Cole is re-elected for Glamorganshire.
24 June – The Honourable Society of Cymmrodorion is revived, having been in abeyance since 1787.
date unknown
The first "colliery school" in the South Wales coalfield is established at Hirwaun.
Thomas Price (Carnhuanawc) founds a Welsh school at Gelli Felen.
Crawshay Bailey becomes a partner at Nant-y-glo ironworks with his brother, Joseph Bailey.
Tondu Ironworks is built by Sir Robert Price.
John Scandrett Harford meets Bishop Thomas Burgess and offers to donate the site of Lampeter Castle for the construction of St David's College.

Arts and literature

New books
Felicia Hemans – The Sceptic
John Jones (Tegid) – Traethawd ar Gadwedigaeth yr Iaith Gymraeg
Robert Jones – Drych yr Amseroedd
William Probert - Y Gododdin (first English translation)

Music
Edward Jones – Hen Ganiadau Cymru

Births
13 May – Robert Owen, theologian (d. 1902)
21 May – Sir Thomas Lloyd, 1st Baronet, politician and landowner (d. 1877)
22 May – Sir Watkin Williams-Wynn, 6th Baronet, politician (d. 1885)
20 June – Thomas Essile Davies (Dewi Wyn o Essyllt), poet (d. 1891)
5 September – Evan Jones (Ieuan Gwynedd), minister and journalist (d. 1852)

Deaths
20 January – Eliezer Williams, clergyman and genealogist, 75
29 January – King George III of the United Kingdom, Prince of Wales 1751–1760, 81
6 May – Wilmot Vaughan, 2nd Earl of Lisburne, landowner, 64
16 June – Thomas Jones of Denbigh, Methodist preacher and writer, 64
27 June – William Lort Mansel, bishop and academic, 67
23 August – Edward Randles, harpist, 57
28 August – Henry Mills, musician, 63

References

 
Wales
Wales